Gustav Grauer Farm, also known as the Maple Springs Farm and Creminscroft, is a historic home and farm located near Pacific, Franklin County, Missouri. The farmhouse was built about 1866 by German immigrants, and is a two-story, enclosed dogtrot log structure that was later clapboarded.  Also on the property are the contributing barn, smokehouse spring house, and shed.

It was listed on the National Register of Historic Places in 1984.

References

Houses on the National Register of Historic Places in Missouri
Farms on the National Register of Historic Places in Missouri
Houses completed in 1866
Buildings and structures in Franklin County, Missouri
National Register of Historic Places in Franklin County, Missouri